Tokyo Bankers Association Building in Marunouchi district of Tokyo. Built on top of the previous building.

Gallery

References 

Former skyscrapers
Skyscraper office buildings in Tokyo
Office buildings completed in 1993
1993 establishments in Japan
Buildings and structures in Chiyoda, Tokyo
Marunouchi